Bayly Park was a cricket ground in Hāwera, Taranaki, New Zealand.  First-class cricket was first played there in 1892 when Taranaki played Hawke's Bay.  A further first-class match came in 1895 when Taranaki played the touring Fijians, with another first-class fixture against Hawke's Bay following in 1897.  The final first-class match played there came in 1898 when Taranaki played Canterbury.  The ground still exists today, but first class cricket is no longer played there.

References

External links
Bayly Park at ESPNcricinfo
Bayly Park at CricketArchive

Cricket grounds in New Zealand
Defunct cricket grounds in New Zealand
Sports venues in Taranaki
Hāwera